The Clohessy–Wiltshire equations describe a simplified model of orbital relative motion, in which the target is in a circular orbit, and the chaser spacecraft is in an elliptical or circular orbit. This model gives a first-order approximation of the chaser's motion in a target-centered coordinate system.

Solution 
Since these matrices are easily invertible, we can also solve for the initial conditions given only the final conditions and the properties of the target vehicle's orbit.

See also

 Orbital maneuver
 Orbital mechanics
 Space rendezvous

References

Further reading 

 Prussing, John E. and Conway, Bruce A. (2012). Orbital Mechanics (2nd Edition), Oxford University Press, NY, pp. 179–196.

External links 

 The Clohessy-Wiltshire Equations of Relative Motion
 DERIVATION OF APPROXIMATE EQUATIONS FOR SOLVING THE PLANAR RENDEZVOUS PROBLEM

Orbits
Astrodynamics
Spaceflight